Honderich is a surname. Notable people with the surname include:

Ted Honderich, British philosopher
Beland Honderich, Canadian newspaper executive who worked on the Toronto Star
John Honderich, publisher of the Toronto Star from 1994–2004

References